Low country is a large lowland. Specific uses are:
 Predominantly, South Carolina Lowcountry in the United States of America
 Low Countries, a historical region in Europe, although rarely used in this context
 see also Netherlands (terminology)
 Low Country (album)